Lerchea is a genus of flowering plants in the family Rubiaceae. It was described by Carl Linnaeus in 1771. The genus is found from southern China to western Malesia.

Species

 Lerchea beccariana (Bakh.f.) B.Axelius
 Lerchea bracteata Valeton
 Lerchea capitata S.Moore
 Lerchea corymbosa Axelius
 Lerchea interrupta Korth.
 Lerchea longicauda L.
 Lerchea micrantha (Drake) H.S.Lo
 Lerchea paniculata Backer ex Bakh.f.
 Lerchea parviflora Axelius
 Lerchea sinica (H.S.Lo) H.S.Lo

References

External links
Lerchea in the World Checklist of Rubiaceae

Rubiaceae genera
Ophiorrhizeae